Bryn and Cwmavon is an electoral ward of Neath Port Talbot county borough, south Wales.  The electoral ward comprises the parishes of Bryn and Cwmavon.

Bryn and Cwmavon consists of some or all of the following areas: Bryn, Brynbryddan, Cwmavon, Pontrhydyfen in the parliamentary constituency of Aberavon.  The largest settlement in the ward is Cwmavon.  The rest of the ward consists mostly of woodland and open moorland.

Bryn and Cwmavon is bounded by the wards of Pelenna and Cymmer to the north; Maesteg and Caerau of Bridgend county borough to the east; Margam, Taibach and Port Talbot to the south; Baglan to the west and Briton Ferry East to the northwest.

In the 2017 local council elections, the electorate turnout for Bryn and Cwmavon was 42%.  The results were:

In the 2012 local council elections, the electorate turnout for Bryn and Cwmavon was 38.57%.  The results were:

References

Electoral wards of Neath Port Talbot